Darkest Hour: Europe '44-'45 is a free modification developed by Darklight Games, and The Darkest Hour Team for Tripwire Interactive's multiplayer first-person shooter video game Red Orchestra: Ostfront 41-45, It is based on the Western Front during World War II between 1944 and 1945, depicting the conflict between Allied and German forces. Several large-scale operations are covered, including the invasion of Normandy, Battle of the Bulge, Operation Market Garden, and Battle of the Hürtgen Forest.

Gameplay

Darkest Hour gameplay style is similar to its parent game, Red Orchestra: Ostfront 41-45, although with many expansive changes especially to the armor system, have many features such as the round shatter, overmatch, the ability to break the traverse of the turret, optics, kill tank crew with a penetrating shot, different ammunition types such as armour-piercing discarding sabot (APDS), armour-piercing ammunition (AP, or HVAP), and high-explosive anti-tank (HEAT), tank brew ups and many other features not in the original game.

Players assume the role of an individual infantryman or tank crew from either the Allied or German forces in an online multiplayer environment. Each team then attempts to accomplish objectives varying by the historical battle the game map is based on. The main type of play consists of an attack and defend style, whereby one team must take objective areas from the opposing team to claim victory.

The game features a complete change of content from its parent in the form of entirely new battlegrounds, vehicles, weapons and uniforms. The Allied team players get the chance to play the role of an American, British or Canadian soldier, while the Axis team play as a soldier from the Waffen SS, Fallschirmjäger and other German divisions.

Over 20 World War II era firearms can be used including the M1 Garand, M1 Carbine, .30-cal, Bren LMG, FG 42, Thompson, Lee–Enfield, American Bazooka, British PIAT and German Panzerschreck. Crewable vehicles include the King Tiger, Jagdpanther, Sherman, Cromwell, M10 Wolverine and Kübelwagen.

Other new improvements have been made to increase gameplay realism, such as bullet suppression, wall mantling, supersonic cracks, shell shock, deployable mortars, player/vehicle damage, and a playable radioman class required for calling in artillery strikes.

Battle locations (official maps)
Maps available for the 2017 official release include:

 Juno Beach – Canadians storming the beach in D-Day-style action.
 Carentan – The US 101st Airborne assaults the town shortly after D-Day.
 Brecourt – 101st Airborne tries to disable a key German artillery battery behind the beaches.
 Vieux – Vast, sweeping armored combat as the British attempt to break out during Operation Goodwood in Normandy.
 Ginkel Heath (near Ede, Netherlands) – British paratroopers drop into a hotly contested landing zone at the start of Operation Market-Garden.
 Wacht-am-Rhein – German armor attempts to seize critical roadways from an American armored unit in the opening hours of the Ardennes Offensive.
 Stoumont – American infantry and armor try to hold back SS PanzerGrenadiers in the streets of a demolished Ardennes town.
 Bois Jacques – Americans in trench-style defense against a combined German tank and infantry force in the forests between Bastogne and Foy, Belgium.
 Foy – German forces defend against attacking American Airborne troopers deep in the Ardennes.
 Noville -
 DogGreen - D-Day 0600hrs - Omaha Beach: Dog Green Sector
 Raids - A British Airborne unit, backed by Cromwell tanks, attempts to take a French town from dug in German troops.
 La Monderie - This is a fictional tank battle taking place in September 1944 somewhere in the country side of France.
 Freyneux and Lamormenil - This map closely models the actual terrain of the Freyneux-Lamormenil area of Belgium in December 1944.
 La Chapelle - US infantry forces supported by a section of tanks must seize the village from a German infantry force.
 Hurtgenwald - While the Hurtgen Forest attracts tourists today because of its forested hills, lakes, and rivers, in 1944 and 1945 it was the site of one of the longest, bloodiest battles in U.S. Army history.
Vieux Recon - Commonwealth reconnaissance forces run into their German counterparts just north of Caen in the early dawn hours.
Carentan Causeway
Cambes-en-Plaine - British armor encounters elements of the 12.SS Panzer Division on D-Day +1.
Caen
 Poteau Ambush - Kamfgruppe Hansen of the 1.SS Leibstandarte ambush a convoy of the American 14th Cavalry Group.
 Hill 108
Hill 400
Kommerscheidt
Simonskall
Lutremange
Bridge Head
Gran

Also, unofficial community-made maps are widely hosted on Darkest Hour's multi-player servers.

History
Game development began in November 2006. First public release occurred on June 6, 2008 as Darkest Hour: Normandy 1944 (to coincide with the 64th anniversary of D-Day). The original Darkest Hour development team, known as Darklight Games, amassed dozens of contributors before the first release. For the subsequent second and third releases, the full team was downsized to "provide an efficient core team of multi-skill leads with a network of contributors who help whenever they can".

After several members of the original development group departed following the second release, the Darklight name was dropped in favor of the more general, Darkest Hour Team. To reach a broader audience, this consolidated group, composed of remaining original team members along with new talent, produced a substantially overhauled version of the game culminating in an acclaimed re-release through Steam in June 2009 under its current title, Darkest Hour: Europe '44-45.

In the following years, three more updates to the game were released via Steam, adding more maps, vehicles, weapons, and features.

The developers plan to provide official support for Darkest Hour in its current incarnation through Autumn 2011. The current version was released on December 16, 2011.

Future
After 8.0 was released end 2017, the developers are still working on adding content to the game. Some original Red Orchestra maps and other features were added to the mod. Work was begun on adding Mare Nostrum content, another mod for Red Orchestra 41–44, to Darkest Hour. The game is still played internationally, with several actively hosted European servers.

Reception
Darkest Hour made it into Mod DB's top 100 unreleased mods of 2007. Egames.de, a prominent German gaming website, featured the game on its release.

References

External links
 Darkest Hour: Europe '44-'45 at Steam
 Darkest Hour: Europe '44-'45 at Facebook
 Darkest Hour: Europe '44-'45 at YouTube
 Darkest Hour ModDB page

World War II first-person shooters
Multiplayer online games
Windows games
Tactical shooter video games
2008 video games
Linux games